Mahajjah (also spelled Mahajjah, Muhajja or Mhajjeh) is a town in the Izra' District of the Daraa Governorate in southern Syria located north of Daraa. It is situated about 63 kilometers south of the capital Damascus. Nearby localities include Khabab to the northeast, Tubna to the north, Inkhil to the northwest, Jasim to the west, Nawa to the southwest, Izra and al-Shaykh Maskin to the south and the volcanic Lejat plain to the east. In the 2004 census by the Syria Central Bureau of Statistics (CBS), Mahajjah had a population of 9,982. Its inhabitants are predominantly Muslims and Catholics.

Mahajjah's principal economic activity is agriculture and the population is rural. The average net income for an individual owning one hectare in the village was around LS 5,000 (US$446). Large landowners who would own 10 hectares would make an average annual income of LS 45,000 (US$4,018).

History
Local Muslim tradition holds that the prophet Muhammad had sat on or leaned against a stone at Mahajjah and that the stone would ease the pain of childbirth. The 13th-century Syrian geographer Yaqut al-Hamawi dismissed the local claim, asserting that Muhammad had not traveled beyond Bosra, a town lying further south of Mahajjah. The late 12th-early 13th-century Persian traveler Ali al-Harawi noted that Mahajjah was one of the ziyarat of the Hauran plain, a site of local Muslim pilgrimage.

Al-Hamawi visited the town during Ayyubid rule, in the 1220s, noting that Mahajjah was "One of the villages of the Hauran" and that local tradition held that "seventy prophets" were buried in the town's Friday mosque. Yusuf al-Muhajji (1287-1338), a native of Mahajjah, became the Chief Qadi of the Shafi'i school of Sunni Islam in 1332, during Mamluk rule. He was dismissed from his post in 1334 and imprisoned, a move that angered the Shafi'is.

In 1596 Mahajjah appeared in the Ottoman tax registers  as Muhajja and was part of the nahiya of Bani Kilab in the Hauran Sanjak. It had an entirely Muslim population consisting of 40 households and 24 bachelors. The villagers paid a fixed tax-rate of 40%  on wheat, barley, summer crops, goats and beehives; a total of 28,100 akçe. All of the revenue went to a waqf (= an Islamic charitable institution).

References

Bibliography

External links
Map of town, Google Maps
Naoua-map, 20L

Populated places in Izra' District